Tufan Lake is the highest mountain lake in Azerbaijan, located at an altitude of  above sea level between the Kurvedağ and Tufandağ mountains in the eastern part of the Main Caucasian Range. It is located in the north of the Qabala District near the border with the Qusar District.

References 

Lakes of Azerbaijan